Sergey Kirsanov (Сергій Кірсанов) (born January 2, 1963 in Ukraine) is a Soviet and Ukrainian sprint canoer who competed in the late 1980s and early 1990s. Competing in two Summer Olympics, he won a silver medal in the K-4 1000 m event at Seoul in 1988.

Kirsanov also won seven medals at the ICF Canoe Sprint World Championships with three golds (K-4 500 m: 1987, 1989, 1990), two silvers (K-4 500 m: 1986, K-4 1000 m: 1990), and two bronzes (K-4 500 m: 1991, K-4 1000 m: 1987).

References

Sports-reference.com profile

1963 births
Canoeists at the 1988 Summer Olympics
Canoeists at the 1992 Summer Olympics
Living people
Olympic canoeists of the Soviet Union
Olympic canoeists of the Unified Team
Olympic silver medalists for the Soviet Union
Soviet male canoeists
Olympic medalists in canoeing
Ukrainian male canoeists
ICF Canoe Sprint World Championships medalists in kayak

Medalists at the 1988 Summer Olympics